Martin Leon Bregman (May 18, 1926 – June 16, 2018) was an American film producer and personal manager. He produced many films, including Scarface, Sea of Love, Venom, Serpico, Dog Day Afternoon, The Four Seasons, Betsy's Wedding, Carlito's Way, Carlito's Way: Rise to Power, The Bone Collector, and The Adventures of Pluto Nash.

Early life 
Bregman was born in New York City to Leon and Ida (Granowski) Bregman. He was Jewish and grew up in the Bronx. As a child, he suffered from polio. He began his career selling insurance and first got into the entertainment business as a night club agent.

Career 
Building relationships with investors such as New York real estate magnate Lewis Rudin, Bregman moved successfully into personal management, eventually representing such stars as Al Pacino, Woody Allen, Barbra Streisand, Faye Dunaway, Alan Alda and Bette Midler. Bregman discovered Pacino in an Off Broadway play, and helped to support the actor as he built his stage and then film career, among other things working to land Pacino the actor's first film role in 1971's Panic in Needle Park, winning out over then unknown actor Robert De Niro.

Bregman ventured into film producing in 1973, building projects around Pacino, initially with the Sidney Lumet directed Serpico. The film's acclaim set the path for many more highly acclaimed collaborations with Pacino, including 1975's Dog Day Afternoon, 1983's Scarface, 1989's Sea of Love and 1993's Carlito's Way. In the 1970s Bregman nearly directed David Rabe's screenplay for First Blood with Pacino starring as John Rambo, but Pacino declined to appear because he found the story too dark. Beginning in 1979 with The Seduction of Joe Tynan, and for most of the 1980s, Bregman enjoyed a successful run of films with writer/director Alan Alda. Their creative and business partnership yielded such well received films as The Four Seasons in 1981, Sweet Liberty in 1986, A New Life in 1988 and Betsy's Wedding, in 1990.  Other films include 1999's The Bone Collector with Denzel Washington and 2002's The Adventures of Pluto Nash, starring Eddie Murphy, one of the producer's rare box-office failures. While in 1983, both Alda and Bergman signed deals with Universal Pictures, he was moved off to movie production studio Lorimar Motion Pictures in 1986.

Bregman also produced two short-lived television shows, 1980's S*H*E and 1984's The Four Seasons, with Alda, based on the films.

Personal life 
Bregman lived in New York City and had two sons with former wife Elizabeth Driscoll, Christopher and film producer Michael (Sea of Love, Carlito's Way), and a daughter, singer Marissa Bregman, with another wife, actress Cornelia Bregman (Serpico, Open Season, The Reincarnation of Peter Proud, The Next Man, S*H*E, Venom). He died from a cerebral hemorrhage, aged 92, on June 16, 2018.

Filmography 
He was a producer in all films unless otherwise noted.

Film 

As an actor

Television

References

External links 

1926 births
2018 deaths
20th-century American Jews
Film producers from New York (state)
Burials at Kensico Cemetery
Businesspeople from New York City
People from the Bronx
20th-century American businesspeople
21st-century American Jews